The Right Honourable Henry Burton, KC, PC (2 June 1866 – 25 December 1935) was a South African lawyer and politician.

Biography 

Born in Cape Town, Cape Colony in 1866, Henry Burton was the eldest son of Henry Burton, civil commissioner and resident magistrate. His great-uncle was the judge Sir William Burton. He claimed to be related to Robert Burton, author of The Anatomy of Melancholy.

Burton was educated at St Andrew's College, Grahamstown and the University of the Cape of Good Hope, before being called to the Bar by the Cape Colony Supreme Court in 1892. Burton practiced in Kimberley and became known for his defence of the Cape Colony's black population. Sol Plaatje, a founder of the African National Congress, wrote that Burton was "a negrophilist and did a lot for us while I was in Kimberly."

In the 1898 Cape election, Burton stood in Barkly West for the Afrikaner Bond against Cecil Rhodes. In the election, he was supported by prominent figures, including Olive Schreiner, Sol Plaatje, and Tengo Jabavu. He lost the election, but filed an election petition against Rhodes, which he also lost.

During the Second Boer War, Burton worked as the legal aide of Sir Richard Solomon, Attorney-General of the Cape Colony. In 1902, he was elected to the Cape Legislative Assembly for the constituency of Albert. In 1907, he became a King's Counsel, and in 1908, he joined the government of John X. Merriman as Attorney-General of the Cape Colony.

In 1910, Burton was elected to the Union Parliament as member for Albert, and joined the Union Cabinet. He was Minister of Native Affairs from 1910 to 1912, Minister of Railways and Harbours from 1912 to 1921, and Minister of Finance from 1915 to 1917 and from 1920 to 1924. In 1918, he attended the Imperial War Conference in London as a delegate; on his return, his ship SS Galway Castle was torpedoed in the Bay of Biscay, and he was rescued from one of the open boats.

Burton was sworn of the Imperial Privy Council in 1924. This gave him the style The Right Honourable and the postnominal letters 'P.C.' for the rest of his life.

In retirement, he was the vice-president of the Non-Racial Franchise Association, set up to protect the Cape Qualified Franchise.

Family 

Burton was married to Helen Marie Kannemeyer, one of the founders of Kirstenbosch National Botanical Garden; they had nine children. A son was Flight Officer Percival Ross-Frames Burton, RAF, who was killed when he rammed his plane into a German plane during the Battle of Britain. Another son, Flight Lieutenant William Westbrooke Burton, RAF, was killed during a bombing raid on Cologne.

References 

 https://www.sahistory.org.za/people/henry-burton

1866 births
1935 deaths
South African lawyers
South African Queen's Counsel
South African members of the Privy Council of the United Kingdom
Cape Colony politicians
South African politicians